Charles Augustus Stone was an early electrical engineer and graduate from the Massachusetts Institute of Technology. He co-founded Stone & Webster with his friend Edwin S. Webster. He served as chairman of the company for many years.

Stone & Webster built their business from a base at Stoughton, Massachusetts into a multi-faceted engineering services company that provided engineering, construction, environmental, and plant operation and maintenance services. They became involved with power generation projects, starting with hydroelectric plants of the late 19th-century that led to building and operating electric streetcar systems in a number of cities across the United States. As well as industrial plants, they built the 50-storey General Electric building in New York City, the Cathedral of Learning at the University of Pittsburgh, a landmark now listed in the National Register of Historic Places, as well as buildings for Massachusetts Institute of Technology. Stone & Webster was the prime contractor for the electromagnetic separation plant for the Manhattan Project at Oak Ridge, Tennessee.

References 

1867 births
1941 deaths
Massachusetts Institute of Technology alumni
American electrical engineers
Businesspeople from Massachusetts
People from Newton, Massachusetts
Manhattan Project